Swisscom-Sendeturm St. Chrischona is a communications tower built in 1980–1984 near Basel, Switzerland, on the territory of the municipality Bettingen, Basel-Stadt.

It was built as replacement for a 136 metre tall lattice tower, which was erected at the site in 1962. This lattice tower was once a part of famous Beromünster transmitter.

The tower is 250 m (820 ft) tall - a 98 m steel antenna on a 152 m concrete base - and not generally accessible for the public, although guided visits can be booked. Apart from television, FM Radio and DAB transmitters, and microwave relays, the tower also contains meteorological instruments, two 100 m3 drinking water reservoirs, and a meeting/conference room near the top of the concrete structure.

Architecture 
The television tower Saint Chrischona shows some architecturally specific features.  It is remarkable that it is carried by a striking "3-leg-construction," in contrast to most other television towers nearby.  It has an aerodynamic shape; with a round shaft, the wind from both sides splits and causes at the rear an effect that keeps the tower from swaying too strongly.  The lower part is built star-like, the tower at the apex sways even with strong winds only just up to 30 cm.  The “Anntennenspitze” (round construction method), can sway up to 2.5 metres. The microwave radio relay antenna are of a height between 98 m and 131 m.  VHF antennas are 152 m high.

On the north side is a construction similar to a “backpack” which has a height of 103 m; and two drinking water tanks that are 100 s high that contain water supplies for the municipality of Bettingen.  During the construction, the weight of the water had to be included in the tension of the tower, which is why it stood southwardly inclined before the completion.

The tower stands on a base construction which includes three basements which accommodate company / technical equipment.  Because the location of the tower lies in the seismic zone of Basel – Erdbebengebiet in the Upper Rhine district, this has been built especially securely about the base.  The tower should remain stable in an earthquake up to 8 on the Richter scale.

The television tower was under construction from July 1980 until December 1983, and was put into operation on 2 August 1984.  It replaced a 136 m high steel radio tower that was built in 1962 in Beromünster, where it carried an antenna for medium wave transmission, like today's backup broadcasting tower.  Saint Chrischona was already in use since 1954, a broadcasting tower that was 30 m high at that time which transferred the Swiss television program up to this time.  Today's tower of Saint Chrischona carries broadcasting antennas for Swiss Radio (DRS) and the “Southwest German Radio” (SWR).  Because of this unique construction, it is said that the tower could remain standing during the high winds of a hurricane, where wind speeds appear up to 220 km/h, with an oscillation of only 40 cm.

Technical data

The entire height of 250 meters is divided into a 152 m high shaft with a tower basket and a 98 m high antenna
Architects: Vischer & Weber
Civil Engineer work: Aegerter & Bosshardt
Building cost: 50 million Swiss francs
Concrete volume: 10,000 cubic m
Total weight: 23,000 metric tons, of that; 13,500 metric tons in the foundation and 9,500 metric tons in the tower
Armouring weight; 1,300 metric tons, steel pipe tower, 135 metric tons
Steel for the antenna terraces: 120 metric tons, introduction steel: 90 metric tons
Uses
Transmitter, for the among other things, television programs SF 1 and SF two, the radio programs DRS 1, DRS 2, DRS 3, Baden-Wurttemberg SWR1, SWR2, SWR 3, Baden-Wurttemberg SWR4, radio Basel 1 and radio basilisk.
In addition, the tower serves for the radio and phone transference and for the water supply communications. Measuring instruments are, in addition, used for weather forecasting and aerial coordination. In an emergency the tower can be likewise used as a transmitter.

Broadcast television channels 

* for the programs on: SF1, SF2, TSI1, TSR1

Broadcast radio stations

External links 
 
 Data sheet of the TV Tower St. Chrischona (pdf)

Buildings and structures completed in 1984
Towers in Switzerland
Buildings and structures in Basel-Stadt
20th-century architecture in Switzerland